Auberon Edward William Molyneux Herbert (18 June 1838 – 5 November 1906) was a British writer, theorist, philosopher, and 19th century individualist. He was a son of the 3rd Earl of Carnarvon. He was Liberal Member of Parliament for the two-member constituency of Nottingham from 1870 to 1874.

He promoted a classical liberal philosophy and took the ideas of Herbert Spencer a stage further by advocating voluntary-funded government that uses force only in defence of individual liberty and private property. He is known as the originator of voluntaryism.

Life
Auberon Herbert was born at Highclere Castle on 18 June 1838. He was the third son of the 3rd Earl of Carnarvon, and brother of Henry Herbert, the 4th Earl. Herbert was educated at Eton College, entering the school in 1850. He left school early, having been elected to a founder's kin fellowship at St John's College, Oxford in 1855. In May 1858 he joined the 7th Queen's Own Hussars at Canterbury with the rank of Cornet by purchase, and in June 1859 became a Lieutenant, also by purchase. In the autumn of 1860 he joined the service troops at Umballa, India. In 1861 he returned to England and sold his commission in 1862. He then returned to Oxford, where he was President of the Union in Hilary Term 1862; he graduated B.C.L. in 1862 and D.C.L. in 1865. He lectured in history and jurisprudence at St John's College, and resigned his fellowship in 1869.

In March 1864 he visited the scene of the Prusso-Danish war, and distinguished himself at Dybbol by sallies from the Danish redoubts for the purpose of rescuing the wounded. As a recognition of his bravery he was made a knight of the Order of the Dannebrog. His impressions of the campaign were recorded in his letters to his mother published under the title The Danes in Camp (1864). He went to the United States during the American Civil War, and he witnessed the Siege of Richmond (1864–65). During the Franco-Prussian War he went to France, and was present at the Battle of Sedan (1870). He was outside Paris during the Siege of Paris (1870–71), and was one of the first to enter the city after the capitulation, being nearly shot as a spy on his way in. He remained there during the Paris Commune in the company of his second brother, Alan Herbert, who practised medicine in Paris. In later life he received the Austrian Order of the Iron Crown, third class, for helping to rescue the crew of the Pare, an Austrian vessel wrecked off Westward Ho!

In 1871 Herbert married Lady Florence Amabel, daughter of George Cowper, 6th Earl Cowper. She died in 1886. They had four children. Of their two sons, the elder died in boyhood, while the younger, Auberon Thomas, born in 1876, succeeded Francis Cowper, 7th Earl Cowper as Lord Lucas and Dingwall in 1905.  Their two daughters were Clair Mimram (presumably named for the River Mimram in Hertfordshire), born 1874, and Nan Ino, born 1880, who succeeded her brother as 10th Baroness Lucas and 6th Lady Dingwall.

Political career
He stood as a Conservative candidate for Newport in the 1865 general election but was defeated. He held the post of private secretary to Stafford Northcote, the President of the Board of Trade from 1866 to 1868. He stood as a Liberal candidate for Berkshire in the 1868 election but lost. He served as President of the fourth day of the first ever Co-operative Congress in 1869. He was elected in a by-election for Nottingham in 1870 becoming a Liberal M.P.

For the Elementary Education Act 1870 he supported the principle that all provided schools should be secular or strictly unsectarian. His support for this Act (state provided schools) is in contradiction to his later political position. In 1872 he seconded Sir Charles Dilke's motion for an inquiry into the expenses of the civil list, and followed Sir Charles's example by declaring himself a republican. This led to a scene of great disorder, and the latter part of his speech was inaudible. He took a leading part in the passing of the Protection of Wild Birds Act 1872. He was an ardent supporter of Joseph Arch and spoke at the mass meeting at Leamington on Good Friday 1872, when the National Agricultural Labourers' Union was formed. On account of his objection to taking life he became a vegetarian.

He retired from parliamentary life at the 1874 general election. He took an active part in the agitation caused by the Bulgarian atrocities; organised in 1878 the great 'anti-Jingo' demonstration in Hyde Park against the expected war with Russia; and in 1880 championed the cause of Charles Bradlaugh, speaking at some of the stormy Hyde Park meetings.

He was an ardent but independent supporter of Herbert Spencer. His creed developed a variant of Spencerian individualism which he described as 'voluntaryism'. In 1884 Herbert published his best-known book, A Politician in Trouble about his Soul, a reprint with alterations and additions from The Fortnightly Review. In the first chapters the objections to the party system are discussed, and in the last chapter Spencerian principles are expounded and the doctrine of Laissez-faire is pushed to the extreme point of advocating 'voluntary taxation.' In 1890 Herbert started a small weekly paper, Free Life, which soon became a small separate monthly paper, the Organ of Voluntary Taxation and the Voluntary State which ran until 1901.

Later life
On leaving parliament he took to farming, purchasing Ashley Arnewood farm in Ashley, New Forest, where he lived until his wife's death in 1886. He then moved to the neighbourhood of Burley in the New Forest, and built, after a pre-existing building, 'The Old House,' which was his home until his death on 5 November 1906. He was buried in a grave in the grounds of his house.

Herbert and anarchism
In an announcement of Herbert's death, Benjamin Tucker said, "Auberon Herbert is dead. He was a true anarchist in everything but name. How much better (and how much rarer) to be an anarchist in everything but name than to be an anarchist in name only!" Tucker praised Herbert's work as "a magnificent assault on the majority idea, a searching exposure of the inherent evil of State systems, and a glorious assertion of the inestimable benefits of voluntary action and free competition..." while admonishing him for his support of profit in trade (but believes, unlike Herbert himself, that Herbert's system would result in an economy without profit). According to Eric Mack, Herbert felt that people who "like Tucker, favored the free establishment of defensive associations and juridical institutions were simply making a verbal error in calling themselves "anarchists"."

Herbert explicitly rejected the label "anarchist" for his ideas. He argued that anarchy was a "contradiction," and that the Voluntaryists "reject the anarchist creed." They "believe in a national government, voluntary supported... and only entrusted with force for protection of person and property." He called his system of a national government funded by non-coerced contributions "the Voluntary State."

According to Chris Tame, "He refused to accept the label of 'anarchist', largely because of a semantic decision whereby he labelled the defensive use of force (which, naturally, he accepted) as 'government.'" Richard Sylvan, points out that "a variety of political arrangements and organization, including governments of certain sorts, are entirely compatible with anarchy." Rather, anarchists oppose the state or "coercive government." Sean Sheehan points out, "A distinction that is relevant to the anarchist ideal is the difference between the government, referring to the state, and government, referring to the administration of a political system. Anarchists, like everyone, tend to use the word government as a synonym for state, but what is rejected by anarchism's a priori opposition to the state is not the concept of government as such but the idea of a sovereign order that claims and demand obedience, and if necessary the lives, of its subjects."

Anarchist William R. McKercher notes that Herbert "was often mistakenly taken as an anarchist" but "a reading of Herbert's work will show that he was not an anarchist." The leading British anarchist journal of the time noted that the "Auberon Herbertites in England are sometimes called Anarchists by outsiders, but they are willing to compromise with the inequity of government to maintain private property."  Since the development of anarcho-capitalism in the 1950s, at least one anarcho-capitalist, Hans-Hermann Hoppe, believes that Herbert "develops the Spencerian idea of equal freedom to its logically consistent anarcho-capitalist end" as noted in a bibliography. However, anarcho-capitalist Murray Rothbard disagreed and called Herbert a "near-anarchist."

Criticism
Victor Yarros, an individualist anarchist, noted what he believed to be a key flaw in Herbert's ideology, namely economic inequality. In an article called "Private Property and Freedom", Yarros argued:

  According to Carl Watner, "Herbert never defended his position in Liberty."

Anarcho-communist Peter Kropotkin echoed Yarros and argued that the "modern Individualism initiated by Herbert Spencer is... a powerful indictment against the dangers and wrongs of government, but its practical solution of the social problem is miserable – so miserable as to lead us to inquire if the talk of 'No force' be merely an excuse for supporting landlord and capitalist domination."

John A. Hobson, an early democratic socialist, echoed the anarchist critique in his essay on Herbert, "A Rich Man's Anarchism".  He argued that Herbert's support for exclusive private property would result in the poor being enslaved to the rich. Herbert, "by allowing first comers to monopolise without restriction the best natural supplies" would allow them "to thwart and restrict the similar freedom of those who come after." Hobson gave the "extreme instance" of an island "the whole of which is annexed by a few individuals, who use the rights of exclusive property and transmission... to establish primogeniture." In such a situation, the bulk of the population would be denied the right to exercise their faculties or to enjoy the fruits of their labour, which Herbert claimed to be the inalienable rights of all.  Hobson concluded: "It is thus that the 'freedom' of a few (in Herbert's sense) involves the 'slavery' of the many." Hobson's argument reflected Pierre-Joseph Proudhon's critique of inheritance and land laws in continental Europe in What Is Property? Scholar M. W. Taylor notes that "of all the points Hobson raised... this argument was his most effective, and Herbert was unable to provide a satisfactory response."

Bibliography
Among his published works are:
 The Danes in camp: letters from Sönderborg (1864)
 A Politician in Trouble about his Soul (1884)
 The Right and Wrong of Compulsion by the State (1885)
 A Politician in Sight of Haven: Being a protest against the government of man by man (1890)
 Bad Air and Bad Health (1894) – co-authored with Harold Wager
 Windfall and Waterdrift (1894) – a volume of poetry
 The Voluntaryist Creed (1908)

See also
 Minarchism
 Libertarianism

Notes

Further reading

External links

 
 
 

Auberon Herbert
1838 births
1906 deaths
People educated at Eton College
Alumni of St John's College, Oxford
19th-century English philosophers
Liberal Party (UK) MPs for English constituencies
UK MPs 1868–1874
Younger sons of earls
Libertarian theorists
British libertarians
Presidents of Co-operative Congress
Voluntaryists
19th-century British philosophers
British classical liberals
Presidents of the Oxford Union